Comunicaciones Fútbol Club S.A., better known as Comunicaciones F.C. or Comunicaciones, is a professional football club based in Guatemala City. They compete in the Liga Nacional, the top tier of Guatemalan football. The most popular and successful football clubs in Guatemala, Communicaciones have won 31 National Championships, including having won six consecutive, the most of any Guatemalan club team. In addition to their 31 league titles, Communicaciones have won eight league Cups and ten Supercups. In international competition, Communicaciones have garnered 2 UNCAF Interclub Cups, one CONCACAF Champion's Cup and one CONCACAF League championship.

The club plays their home games at the Estadio Doroteo Guamuch Flores which has a capacity of 26,000.

History

Comunicaciones origins date back to the 1920s to previous incarnations as Hospicio FC and España. Club Comunicaciones was formed in 1949 after Colonel Carlos Aldana Sandoval, then Minister of Telegraphs and Communications, took charge of the team and renamed it Comunicaciones ("Communications" in Spanish).

The club colour is white, which they began using in their kit shortly after the club's foundation, though initially the uniform was cream. Their historic arch-rival is Municipal and the two clubs compete in the El Clásico Chapín, one of the greatest rivalries in Guatemalan football. They also share a rivalry with Quetzaltenango club Xelajú.

Supporters
Since its inception, the Albo fans have been composed of the different strata of Guatemalan society. In the 80s, organized support began to take more momentum, at that time by batons that were located in different sectors of the stadium that were felt with songs, chopped paper, balloons and blankets, marking a different pattern of support from the fans of that time in Guatemalan football.

It was at that time when the nickname of the "Millionaire Fans" was popularly printed by the thousands of fans and fans that the club has throughout the country. Currently the cream fans are the only one in Guatemala who have adopted the type of South American breath in which everyone in the stadium sings in unison giving a unique atmosphere in the stands

La barra brava
In the early 90s, the first organized support group called Fuerza Crema officially emerged, regularly located in the Preference area of the stadium, becoming the largest in the country with more than 2,500 members. It was until mid-1996 that after several differences between its leaders, the Albos force separated.

Some former members of the old group changed sectors in the stadium forming in the same year the barra Vltra Svr (Ultra Sur), a name it adopted due to its location in the General South area of the property. This group is characterized by the songs it provides to the team throughout the match, in addition to receptions, flags and walks, something that was not customary in Guatemalan football.

The barra has large blankets, flags, umbrellas, hype with murgas, trumpets, dubbing and a huge hype brought from Chile to encourage the club. In its beginnings the bar even hosted more than 3,000 members in transcendental matches.

Mascot

Casper
The mascot of Comunicaciones is the ghost Casper who has been accompanying the club since 1985. It was brought from Miami in September 1985 by the then president of the team, Teddy Plocharski, at a cost of $2,000 (15,392.65 Quetzales), being the first mascot to use a soccer team in Central America.

He first appeared at the Doroteo Guamuch on September 8, 1985, for the 124th classic, in which Comunicaciones beat Municipal by 3 to 1. The suit has undergone three transformations since its creation, the first in 1995 and the second 1998, this being the one that is maintained today.

Stadium
The team currently play their home games at the Estadio Doroteo Guamuch Flores, which holds at a capacity of 26,000. They used to play at the Estadio Cementos Progreso before, in which their B team currently play their games there in the Primera División.

Honours

Domestic honours

Leagues
 Liga Nacional de Guatemala 
 Champions (31): 1956, 1957–58, 1959–60, 1968–69, 1970–71, 1971, 1972, 1977, 1979–80, 1981, 1982, 1985–86, 1990–91, 1994–95, 1996–97, 1997–98, 1998–99, Apertura 1999, Clausura 2001, Apertura 2002, Clausura 2003, Apertura 2008, Apertura 2010, Clausura 2011, Apertura 2012, Clausura 2013, Apertura 2013, Clausura 2014, Apertura 2014, Clausura 2015, Clausura 2022

Cups
 Copa de Guatemala and predecessors 
 Champions (8): 1951–52, 1955, 1970, 1972, 1983, 1986, 1991–92, 2009
 Campeón de Campeones (Super Cup) and predecessors 
 Champions (10): 1955, 1957, 1959, 1960, 1983, 1985, 1991, 1994, 1997(2)

Continental honors
 CONCACAF Champions' Cup 
 Champions (1): 1978 (shared with Universidad de Guadalajara and Defence Force)
 Runners up (1): 1962, 1969
 CONCACAF League 
 Champions (1): 2021
 Copa Fraternidad / UNCAF Interclub Cup 
 Champions (2): 1971, 1983
 Runners up (3): 1976, 1977, 2003
 CONCACAF Cup Winners Cup:
 Runners up (1): 1991

Current squad

Out on loan

Managerial history

 José Casés Penadés (1951–1954)
 Federico "Chapuda" Morales (1955–1956)
 José Casés Penadés (1956–1960)
 Carlos Enrique "Ronco" Wellman (1968–1969)
 Walter Ormeño (1970–1971)
 Carmelo Faraone (1971)
 Walter Ormeño (1972)
 Rubén Amorín (1977–1978)
 Walter Ormeño (1979–1980)
 Jorge "Mono" Lainfiesta (1981–1982)
 Salvador Pericullo (1983)
 Ranulfo Miranda (1985)
 Carlos Enrique "Ronco" Wellman (1990–1991)
 Raúl Héctor Cocherari (1991)
 Hernán Godoy (1992)
 Juan Ramón "La Bruja" Verón (1994–1995)
 Carlos Miloc (1996–1997)
 Juan Ramón "La Bruja" Verón (1997–1998)
 Carlos de Toro (1998)
 Carlos Miloc (1998–1999)
 Alexandre Guimarães (1999)
 Dušan Drašković (2000–2001)
 Alberto Aguilar (2001)
 Horacio Cordero (2002–2003)
 Antonio Alzamendi (2004)
 Luis Cubilla (2005)
 Miguel Ángel Brindisi (2005–2007)
 Julio César "El Pocho" Cortés
 Julio González (2009–2010)
 Iván Franco Sopegno (2010–2011)
 Rónald González (2011–2012)
 Iván Franco Sopegno (2013–2014)
 Willy Coito Olivera (2014–2015)
 Iván Franco Sopegno (2015–2017)
 Rónald González  (2017–2018)
 Willy Coito Olivera (2018–2019)
 Mauricio Tapia (2019–2021)
 Willy Coito Olivera (2021–present)

References

External links

 Official Website 

 
Football clubs in Guatemala
Football clubs in Guatemala City
Association football clubs established in 1949
1949 establishments in Guatemala
CONCACAF Champions League winning clubs
C
C